McKenzie Kate Westmore (born April 26, 1977) is an American actress and singer most popular for having played the role of Sheridan Crane Lopez-Fitzgerald on the television soap opera Passions from 1999 to 2008.

Early life
Westmore was born April 26, 1977, in San Fernando, California. She is part of the younger generation of the Westmore family, known for their achievements in film makeup. She is the daughter of makeup artists Marion Christine Bergeson and Michael Westmore. She attended the Los Angeles County High School for the Arts as a music major and graduated in 1995.

Career
Westmore is best known for playing of Sheridan Crane Lopez-Fitzgerald on the television soap opera Passions from 1999 to 2008. To fans of Passions, Sheridan is well known for her popular supercouple pairing with Luis Lopez-Fitzgerald, portrayed by Galen Gering. They are sometimes called "Shuis", blend of both their names.

She guest-starred on an episode of Friends (season 7, episode 18: "The One with Joey's Award") as presenter.

In 2008, she made a guest appearance in season 3 of Dexter.

On December 12, 2008, Westmore debuted in the recurring role of Dr. Riley Sinclair on ABC's daytime drama All My Children.

Since 2011, Westmore has served as the Host of the Syfy original series Face Off, a reality competition featuring makeup artists competing for $100,000.

Personal life
McKenzie Westmore and Keith Volpone were married for 9 years. They married on 25th May 2002. 9 years later they divorced on 3rd Jun 2011. 

On October 11, 2015, Westmore married former Face Off judge Patrick Tatopoulos. The couple met while working together on the first season of the show. The wedding ceremony was held at Chateau Le Dome at Saddlerock Ranch Winery in Malibu, California.

In 2019, Westmore revealed that she has Tourette syndrome, having been diagnosed with the genetic condition at age 10.

McKenzie Westmore is the founder and creative director of Westmore Beauty. She developed the Westmore Beauty Collection to make the tips and tricks available to everyday women that was previously an exclusive for celebrities. McKenzie continues to create new products for the Westmore beauty line.

Filmography

See also
Supercouple
Westmore family

References

External links
Official McKenzie Westmore Site

McKenzie Westmore Producer Profile on The 1 Second Film website
 

1977 births
20th-century American actresses
21st-century American actresses
American film actresses
American soap opera actresses
American television actresses
Living people
Actresses from California
Los Angeles County High School for the Arts alumni
McKenzie